The 2018 Missouri elections happened on November 6, 2018.

United States Senate 

This was one of the most hotly contested Senate elections in the entire country in 2018, and that most of the people rating this election saw this as the most close races. Incumbent Claire McKaskil was holding on to her seat as Donald Trump had just won this state by a large margin 2 years ago, even though she won big in the 2012 election.

United States House of Representatives

State Auditor

State Senate

District 2

District 4

District 6

District 8

District 10

District 12

District 14

District 16

District 18

District 20

District 22

District 24

District 26

District 28

District 30

District 32

District 34

References

 
Missouri